Ignacio Martínez de Pisón (born in Zaragoza in 1960) is a Spanish writer. He is the author of more than a dozen books, among which the most notable are:

 El día de  mañana (2011; Premio de la Crítica, Premio Ciutat de Barcelona, Premio de las Letras Aragonesas, Premio Hislibris), 
 La buena reputación (2014; Premio Nacional de Narrativa, Premio Cálamo al Libro del Año)

His novel Enterrar a los muertos has been translated into English by Anne McLean.

Selected works
 Aeropuerto de Funchal 
 Carreteras secundarias 
 Dientes de leche 
 Derecho natural
 El día de mañana 
 El fin de los buenos tiempos 
 El tiempo de las mujeres 
 Enterrar a los muertos 
 Filek 
 La buena reputación 
 La ternura del dragón 
 María bonita

References

External links

Spanish writers
Spanish literature
Spanish male writers
21st-century Spanish male writers
1960 births
Living people